Ribble Valley is a constituency in Lancashire represented in the House of Commons of the UK Parliament since 1992 by Nigel Evans, a Conservative. Evans has served as a Deputy Speaker of the House of Commons and Second Deputy Chairman of Ways and Means since January 2020; he previously served as First Deputy Chairman of Ways and Means from 2010 to 2013.

History
The Ribble Valley constituency was created in 1983 almost wholly from the former seat of Clitheroe. Much of the eastern part of the constituency lies within the historic county boundaries of the West Riding of Yorkshire.

Constituency profile
The constituency enjoys scenic villages for both commuters and the retired, has slightly higher than national average income and much lower than average reliance upon social housing. As of December 2012, unemployment was significantly lower than the national average.

With the exception of one year when, following a by-election, it was represented by a Liberal Democrat, the MP has been a Conservative; the lowest majority was 11.6% in 1997. Boundary changes in 2010 brought in more urban areas from the neighbouring South Ribble district, and with it a large number of Labour voters, particularly in Bamber Bridge where all four local councillors are Labour, alongside Farington and Lostock Hall.

Six of the divisions on Lancashire County Council within the Ribble Valley constituency after the 2013 United Kingdom local elections were Conservative-held, with Labour having one. The Conservatives gained one division each from the Liberal Democrats and the Idle Toad parties, while Labour took one from the Conservatives. Labour also gained another Conservative seat, which crosses the boundaries of the Ribble Valley and South Ribble constituencies.

The constituency comprises the whole of the Borough of Ribble Valley and a part of the Borough of South Ribble. In March 2015, two councillors, a Liberal Democrat and an Independent, defected to the Conservatives. Since the May 2015 local elections the council has been composed of 35 Conservative, 4 Liberal Democrat and 1 Labour councillors. 14 of the 19 South Ribble Borough councillors within the Ribble Valley constituency are Conservative, and 5 are Labour.

Boundaries

1983 to 1997:  The Borough of Ribble Valley, and the Borough of Preston wards of Cadley, Greyfriars, Preston Rural East, and Sharoe Green.

1997 to 2010:  The Borough of Ribble Valley, the City of Preston wards of Cadley, Greyfriars, Preston Rural East, Sharoe Green, and Sherwood, and the Borough of South Ribble wards of All Saints, and Samlesbury and Cuerdale.

2010 to 2015:  The Borough of Ribble Valley, and the ten Borough of South Ribble wards of Bamber Bridge East, Bamber Bridge North, Bamber Bridge West, Coupe Green and Gregson Lane, Farington East, Farington West, Lostock Hall, Samlesbury and Walton, Tardy Gate, and Walton-le-Dale.

2015–present: The Borough of Ribble Valley, and the nine Borough of South Ribble wards of Bamber Bridge East, Bamber Bridge West, Coupe Green and Gregson Lane, Farington East, Farington West, Lostock Hall, Samlesbury and Walton, Walton-le-Dale East and Walton-le-Dale West.

In the run up to the 2010 general election, the Boundary Commission's Fifth Periodic Review of Westminster constituencies led Parliament to approve the creation of a new seat of Wyre and Preston North. This creation caused major changes to seats including Ribble Valley, bringing a more urban element to the largely farming and rural mix of the existing seat.

Members of Parliament

Elections

Elections in the 2010s

Elections in the 2000s

Elections in the 1990s

Elections in the 1980s

See also
List of parliamentary constituencies in Lancashire

Notes

References

External links
Ribble Valley Borough Council official site

Parliamentary constituencies in North West England
Constituencies of the Parliament of the United Kingdom established in 1983
Politics of Ribble Valley
Politics of South Ribble